Ghost Mountain is a mountain in the Owen Stanley Ranges in the South East of Papua New Guinea, also known locally as Suwemalla.

Ghost Mountain may also refer to:
Intaba Yemikhovu or Ghost Mountain, a mountain near Mkuze in KwaZulu-Natal, South Africa 
Ghost Mountain (Pacific Ranges) in British Columbia, Canada
Ghost Mountain (Park Ranges) in British Columbia, Canada
"Ghost Mountain", a 2003 song by the Unicorns from Who Will Cut Our Hair When We're Gone?
Ghost Mountain, former rapper